The Azerbaijan men's national tennis team represents Azerbaijan in Davis Cup tennis competition and are governed by the Azerbaijan Tennis Federation. They have not competed since 2013.

Their best finish is fourth in Group III in 2003.

History
Azerbaijan competed in its first Davis Cup in 1996.  Azerbaijani players previously represented the Soviet Union.

Current Team (2022) 

 Tamerlan Azizov
 Kanan Gasimov (Junior player)
 Rasul Gojayev
 Arif Guliyev
 Imran Abdulla

See also
Davis Cup
Azerbaijan Fed Cup team

External links

Davis Cup teams
Davis Cup
Davis Cup
1996 establishments in Azerbaijan
Sports clubs established in 1996